The 2014 Gibraltar Darts Trophy was the fifth of eight PDC European Tour events on the 2014 PDC Pro Tour. The tournament took place at the Victoria Stadium in Gibraltar, between 27–29 June 2014. It featured a field of 48 players and £100,000 in prize money, with £20,000 going to the winner.

James Wade won his first European Tour title by beating Steve Beaton 6–4 in the final.

Prize money

Qualification and format
The top 16 players from the PDC ProTour Order of Merit on 19 May 2014 automatically qualified for the event. The remaining 32 places went to players from three qualifying events - 20 from the UK Qualifier (held in Crawley on 23 May), eight from the European Qualifier and four from the Host Nation Qualifier (both held at the venue the day before the event started).

The following players took part in the tournament:

Top 16
  Michael van Gerwen (second round)  
  Gary Anderson (quarter-finals)
  Brendan Dolan (third round)
  Robert Thornton (third round)
  Phil Taylor (second round) 
  Dave Chisnall (third round)
  Peter Wright (second round) 
  Kim Huybrechts (quarter-finals)
  Ian White (third round)
  Steve Beaton (runner-up)
  Mervyn King (second round) 
  Jamie Caven (third round)
  Adrian Lewis (quarter-finals)
  Simon Whitlock (semi-finals) 
  Justin Pipe (third round)
  Andy Hamilton (second round) 

UK Qualifier 
  Wes Newton (second round) 
  Kevin Painter (second round)
  Michael Smith (semi-finals)
  Johnny Haines (third round)
  Pete Dyos (second round) 
  Adam Hunt (quarter-finals)
  Andy Parsons (second round) 
  James Wade (winner)
  Daryl Gurney (second round) 
  Dean Winstanley (second round) 
  Matt Clark (first round)  
  Andy Smith (first round)  
  Richie Burnett (first round)  
  Jason Lovett (first round)  
  Ben Ward (first round)  
  James Hubbard (second round)
  John Henderson (second round)
  Denis Ovens (first round)  
  Mark Walsh (first round)  
  Mark Webster (first round) 

European Qualifier
  Ronny Huybrechts (first round) 
  Antonio Alcinas (first round) 
  Dimitri Van den Bergh (second round)
  Vincent van der Voort (first round) 
  Jyhan Artut (second round)
  Ryan de Vreede (first round) 
  Benito van de Pas (third round)
  Gino Vos (first round)

Host Nation Qualifier
  Henry Zapata (first round)
  Antony Lopez (first round)  
  Manuel Vilerio (first round)  
  Dyson Parody (second round)

Draw

References

2014 PDC European Tour
2014 in Gibraltarian sport
Darts in Gibraltar